Thylacine is the debut studio album by Australian singer-songwriter, Monique Brumby.

At the ARIA Music Awards of 1998, the album was nominated for ARIA Award for Best Female Artist, but lost out to Left of the Middle by Natalie Imbruglia.

Track listings
 "Mary"	
 "It's Alright"
 "Fool for You"	
 "The Change in Me"	
 "One Day"	
 "Lava"	
 "Up and Down"	
 "Just Like That"	
 "Fallen Angel"	
 "Natural"	
 "Bring it on Home"

Charts

References

Monique Brumby albums
1997 debut albums
Sony Music Australia albums